The Juneau-class cruisers were United States Navy light cruisers that were modified version of the  design. Three ships were ordered and built, all completed shortly after World War II, but only  remained active long enough to see action during the Korean War.

Redesign
Watertight integrity was improved by removing doors on the lowest decks of the ship between bulkheads. In addition, all the anti-submarine armament was removed, along with the torpedo battery.

Specifications
The main gun battery of the Juneau class was composed of six dual 5-inch/38 caliber (127 mm) gun mounts (twelve 5-inch guns). The class was designed with a secondary anti-aircraft armament of thirty-two 40 mm anti-aircraft guns, and sixteen 20 mm rapid-fire anti-aircraft cannon with high-explosive shells. After the war, the ships were planned to convert to a  secondary armament to replace the 40 mm guns, but only Juneau was converted.

The ships were originally designed for 47 officers and 695 men.

Service history
Three ships were built and none of the ships served during World War II; the lead ship of this class,   which was named after the war loss , was launched on 15 July 1945 and commissioned on 15 February 1946.  was launched on 22 September 1945, and commissioned on 17 May 1946.  was launched on 5 March 1946 and commissioned on 27 November 1946.

Spokane and Fresno were decommissioned in 1949 and 1950 prior to the start of the Korean War, but Juneau, at this point redesignated as an anti-aircraft cruiser CLAA-119, participated in the conflict. She was decommissioned in 1955, shortly after the war ended. All three ships were considered for refitting as guided missile cruisers or ASW ships but ultimately were sold for scrap in the 1960s.

Ships in class

See also
 List of cruisers of the United States Navy

Footnotes

References

External links

Cruiser classes